was a Japanese professional Go player. Born in Tokyo, Kato became a student of Hirose Heijiro in 1907. He turned professional a year later with the Hoensha. He was promoted to 8 dan in 1942. He participated in the 1st Honinbo tournament where he finished runner-up to Riichi Sekiyama.

Titles and runners-up

References

1891 births
1952 deaths
Japanese Go players